Liathmore Churches are two medieval churches forming a National Monument in County Tipperary, Ireland.

Location

Liathmore Churches are located 2.8 km (1.8 mi) east of Two-Mile Borris.

History
St Mochoemog (d. 655) founded the monastery here. There are two churches and the footings of a round tower.

The smaller church is the earlier and dates to the early medieval period; the larger church is late medieval and was begun in the 12th century, and contains a number of tombs.

Building

The sheela-na-gig is located on the left hand side of a Romanesque doorway belonging to the larger of the two churches.

The larger church: nave is 41'4" x 18'8" (12.6 x 5.7 m), and the chancel 26'9" x 16'2" (8.2 x 4.9 m). It was originally a single-chamber church with antae at the east end.

The circular foundation proved to be the base of an Irish round tower. As there is no historical record or oral tradition of a tower here it is thought that it must have fallen, and its stones removed, sometime before 1500. The diameter was 15 ft. 6in. (4.7 m).

References

Religion in County Tipperary
Archaeological sites in County Tipperary
National Monuments in County Tipperary
Former churches in the Republic of Ireland